is a Japanese anime television series produced and animated by Sunrise (now Bandai Namco Filmworks). It is a sequel to the Inuyasha anime series, which itself is based on the original manga series of the same title by Rumiko Takahashi. It follows the adventures of Towa Higurashi and Setsuna, Sesshomaru and Rin's fraternal twin daughters, and Moroha, Inuyasha and Kagome Higurashi's daughter. The series' first season aired from October 2020 to March 2021; a second season aired from October 2021 to March 2022. A manga adaptation, illustrated by Takashi Shiina, started in Shogakukan's shōnen manga magazine Shōnen Sunday S in September 2021.

Viz Media has licensed the series for North and Latin American territories, while Medialink has licensed it for Southeast Asian and South Asian territories.

Plot

Ten years after the events of Inuyasha, Sesshomaru and Rin's daughter Towa is separated from her twin sister Setsuna, and gets stranded in the modern era, where she is adopted into the family of her father's sister-in-law, Kagome Higurashi, raised by Kagome's younger brother Sōta and his warmhearted wife Moe. Towa becomes close to her younger adopted sister, six-year-old Mei, who is Towa's “substitute” for Setsuna.

Ten years later, Towa is reunited with Setsuna, when she leaves the modern era through the vast time-traveling power of the mystical Sacred Tree of Ages. During their separation, Setsuna became one of the demon-slayers working with Kohaku and does not remember her past, as the mythical Dream Butterfly stole her dreams and memories. In order to restore them, the half-demon twins embark on an adventure, alongside their quarter-demon bounty hunter cousin Moroha, the fourteen-year-old daughter of Kagome and Inuyasha, who lacks knowledge of her parents; except that her human mother is an uppermost-level priestess and that her equally impulsive father is a dog-demon/human hybrid. 

At times, the vital essence of the Sacred Tree of Ages awakens from centuries of dormancy to warn them that a long-standing rival of their paternal dog-demon grandfather is plotting to warp time itself, since Sesshomaru refuses to fight him directly in place of his late father. At the same time, the unparalleled time-based unsurpassable entity is harboring adult Rin in suspended animation for her husband Sesshomaru because of her fatal connection to Zero, the elder sister of Kirinmaru and creator of the seven mystical Rainbow Pearls, whose respective mighty demonic abilities rival those of the Sacred Jewel of Four Souls itself. During a battle with Kirinmaru at the ruins of Lady Izayoi's mansion, Setsuna is seemingly killed by Kirinmaru, but Towa uses the broken Tenseiga to revive Setsuna.

Setsuna has her Kanemitsu no Tomoe upgraded by Tōtōsai into the mighty Yukari no Tachikiri, which can cut the invisible red threads of fate. Towa receives the legendary cosmic sword Zanseiken from Kirinmaru's deceased daughter Rion, whose soul is contained within an artificial body created by her father. The Half-Demon Princesses must become strong enough to save Rin, before she perishes from the fatal curse placed on her by the deeply bitter Zero. Ultimately, Zero lifts the curse herself and passes on to Heaven. As Towa and Setsuna are ready to reunite with Rin, Kirinmaru gives an ultimatum for Moroha to save her parents or steal Akuru's pinwheel.

Sesshomaru rechallenges Kirinmaru with Sesshomaru taking the hit for his twin daughters and half-niece, which fatally wounds and weakens him. He manages to use his remaining strength to send them into the Black Pearl, where the girls meet Inuyasha and Kagome Higurashi. After escaping from the Black Pearl using the combined powers of Tessaiga and Tenseiga, the group discovers that Kirinmaru's true objective is to travel to the Reiwa Era to destroy the Grim Comet that threatens to destroy human civilization, and become a supreme ruler over all humans and demons alike. After saving Sesshomaru, Towa discovers that Kirinmaru allowed her to keep Zanseiken so that her soul is eventually extinguished by using its power so that he can use her body as a living vessel for Rion against the wishes of his undead daughter while Moroha is given a spiritually-empowered longbow made by Inuyasha and Kagome, which greatly boosts the effectiveness and spiritual energies of her sacred arrows. 

Using Akuru's pinwheel, the Half-Demon Princesses travel back to the modern era to destroy the comet themselves, with Kirinmaru chasing after them. They encounter Osamu Kirin, formerly Kirinmaru's right arm, and Towa's homeroom teacher, who informs them about his desire to save humanity. However, he double-crosses the girls and brings the Grim Comet to the feudal era to grant Kirinmaru's wish in obliterating it from the plane of existence, and showing Rion various countries and states from around the modern world. With the last of his strength, Akuru opens the gateway to the ancient past on the Sacred Tree of Ages, so the girls can return to help their parents and closest friends in preventing the Degenerate Age from progressing further.

Media

Anime

The series was first announced in May 2020. It aired from October 3, 2020 to March 20, 2021 on Yomiuri TV and Nippon TV. The series was produced and animated by Sunrise (later renamed as Bandai Namco Filmworks), directed by Teruo Sato with main character designs by Inuyasha original creator Rumiko Takahashi. Staff from Inuyasha returned, with Katsuyuki Sumisawa in charge of the scripts while Rumiko Takahashi acted as storyboard supervisor, Yoshihito Hishinuma in charge of the anime character designs and Kaoru Wada composing the music. The opening theme "New Era" was performed by the male idol group SixTones, while the ending theme "Break" was performed by Uru. The second opening theme “Burn” was performed by NEWS, while the second ending theme "Kesshō" was performed by Ryokuōshoku Shakai.

Viz Media announced the rights to digital streaming, EST, and home video release of the series for North and Latin American territories. Viz Media streamed the series on Crunchyroll, Funimation and Hulu. On October 26, 2020, Funimation announced a partnership with Viz Media to release an English dub of the series, with the English cast of Inuyasha reprising their roles. Funimation began streaming the English dub on November 6, 2020 along with Hulu and Crunchyroll. The English dub of the series began broadcasting on Adult Swim's Toonami programming block beginning on June 27, 2021. Medialink licensed the series in Southeast Asian territories. The series premiered on Animax Asia on June 21, 2021.

On March 20, 2021, a second season of the series was announced following the release of the 24th episode. The second season, titled Yashahime: Princess Half-Demon – The Second Act, aired from October 2, 2021, to March 26, 2022. The opening theme is “ReBorn” performed by NEWS, while the ending theme is "Toumei na Sekai" performed by Little Glee Monster. The second opening theme is "Kyōmei" performed by SixTones, while the second ending theme is "Anaaki no Sora" by Adieu (Moka Kamishiraishi).

Manga
A manga adaptation by Takashi Shiina, with script cooperation by Katsuyuki Sumisawa, started in Shogakukan's Shōnen Sunday S on September 25, 2021. Shogakukan released the first collected tankōbon volume on January 18, 2022. As of October 12, 2022, three volumes have been released.

Viz Media has licensed the manga for English release in North America. The first volume was released on June 21, 2022.

Volume list

Reception
The series ranked 9th on Animage's 43rd Anime Grand Prix in 2020. Rumiko Takahashi and Yoshihito Hishinuma were nominated for the Best Character Design category in the Crunchyroll's 2021 Anime Awards. 

In her review of the first two episodes, Kara Dennison of Otaku USA made positive comments about the series, praising its cast and its way to "echo the story of Inuyasha without simply retreading it." James Beckett and Monique Thomas of Anime News Network listed Yashahime: Princess Half-Demon as one of the worst anime of the winter 2021 season. Rebecca Silverman of the same website also listed it as one of the worst anime of 2021. The series received criticism from some reviewers for its portrayal of Sesshomaru and Rin as a couple, considering the fact that in the original Inuyasha series, Sesshomaru traveled along with Rin when she was a young girl, calling their relationship "grooming."

References

Further reading

External links
  
  
  
 
 

Inuyasha
Adventure anime and manga
Animated television series about sisters
Animated television series about twins
Anime and manga about time travel
Aniplex
Exorcism in anime and manga
Fantasy anime and manga
Funimation
Medialink
Nippon TV original programming
Sengoku period in fiction
Sequel television series
Shogakukan manga
Shōnen manga
Sunrise (company)
Time travel in television
Toonami
Viz Media anime
Viz Media manga
Yōkai in anime and manga
Yomiuri Telecasting Corporation original programming